Triptykon is the fourth album by Norwegian saxophonist Jan Garbarek, his third release on the ECM label, and is performed by Garbarek with Arild Andersen and Edward Vesala.

Reception 
The Allmusic review by Brian Olewnick awards the album 4½ stars and states, "Norwegian saxophonist Jan Garbarek took several intriguing stylistic turns early in his career, none more extreme than that shown on Triptykon... an expressionist trio drawing on both free improvisation and Scandinavian folk tunes, roaring, stumbling, and reeling, evoking an aural equivalent of Edvard Munch. Garbarek's work on all his reeds is assured and imaginative, even as the context is often dark and bleak... Highly recommended".

Track listing 
All compositions by Jan Garbarek, Arild Anderson, Edward Vesala except where noted.
 "Rim" – 10:33
 "Selje" – 2:16
 "J.E.V." – 7:28
 "Sang" – 2:45
 "Triptykon" – 12:46
 "Etu Hei!" (Garbarek, Vesala) – 2:20
 "Bruremarsj" (Traditional) – 4:13

Personnel 
 Jan Garbarek – soprano saxophone, tenor saxophone, bass saxophone, flute
 Arild Andersen – bass
 Edward Vesala – percussion

References 

Jan Garbarek albums
1973 albums
ECM Records albums
Albums produced by Manfred Eicher